The Bharuch–Dahej line belongs to  division of Western Railway zone in Gujarat State.

History

Bharuch–Jambusar branch was opened in 1914. The length of Bharuch–Jambusar branch was 47 km. Samni–Dahej branch was opened in 1930. The length of Samni–Dahej branch was 39 km. Foundation stone for Bharuch–Dahej line Gauge conversion was laid in 2008. The Narrow gauge to Broad gauge conversion of Bharuch–Dahej line was completed in 2011. Regular train operations was started in 2012.

References

5 ft 6 in gauge railways in India
Railway lines in Gujarat

Transport in Bharuch